Ia Ia, I Do, is a 2012 co-produced Mainland China and Taiwan romance comedy drama. The "Ia Ia" from the title is the sound of whining in Chinese which is pronounced "Ah Ya Ah Ya". The drama stars Dylan Kuo, Tammy Chen, Song Min Yu, Re Yi Zha and Xu Yue. Directed by Yang Guan Yu and Ke Zheng Ming, the drama is produced by Chinese web streaming site Tudou. Filming began on September 5, 2011 on location in Taiwan and Dongshan County in Fujian province, China and finished on December 9, 2011.

Synopsis
Qin Ai Ya is a hard working individual who works many odd jobs to save up money. Due to a past heartbreak she does not think about love but only cares about making money. Her dream is to marry a rich guy so she can live a relaxing life, but she mistakes Ji Xiang En, a rich land developer, for a poor waiter she met at a party.

Summary
Qin Ai Ya (Tammy Chen) is an orphan who lives on the beautiful but impoverished Yuan Zhou Island. She was raised and taken care of by the local residents of the island. Due to a past relationship that ended in heartbreak Ai Ya does not believe in true love anymore, instead focusing on making money and dreaming of becoming rich. To save money and make a living she works many odd jobs such as last-minute wedding photographer, hired actress to break up with someone and drug store manager.

Ji Xiang En (Dylan Kuo) is the tall and handsome CEO of a land development corporation. His father died when he was young leaving him to take care of the family business and his mother. Due to his attractive background and looks, gossip magazines constantly him to many beauties but his love only belongs to Tong Hua (Reyizha Alimjan), his childhood friend who is a rich girl who became a famous actress. Xiang En desperately wants Tong Hua to marry him but she feels she does not love him enough to accept his marriage proposal. When his former friend and classmate Wu Wei (Song Min Yu) shows up to even an old score, Wu Wei courts Tong Hua who he knows is a very important person of Xiang En. Xiang En is heartbroken when he finds out about Tong Hua and Wu Wei relationship in the tabloids.

Ai Ya and Xiang En first encounter each other when she is chasing a purse snatching thief, barefoot in an evening gown on the streets of Taipei. When doing so she damages Xiang En's brand new expensive car without realizing it. The two meet again when Ai Ya crashes a high-profile charity party in hopes of meeting a rich guy. She runs into Xiang En who pretends to be a waiter while trying to get away from tabloid photographers trying to capture images of him and Tong Hua together. Ai Ya mistakes him for a poor waiter when he ruins her dress and soon a lot of misunderstanding ensues between the two.

Ai Ya, Xiang En, Tong Hua and Wu Wei cross paths when Tong Hua's father's corporation is considering developing a seaside resort in Yuan Zhou Island. Xiang En and Wu Wei fight to win the contract for the project, but must gain the local residents' support in order to be the better prospect. It seems the only person that can help them is Qin Ai Ya. As Xiang En and Ai Ya become closer she helps him get over Tong Hua and he breaks the barrier that has prevented her from loving another.

Cast

Main cast
Dylan Kuo 郭品超 as Ji Xiang En 季翔恩
Tammy Chen 陳怡蓉 as Qin Ai Ya 秦璦亞
Song Min Yu 宋珉宇 as Wu Wei 吳維
Reyizha Alimjan 热依扎 as Tong Hua 童樺
Xu Yue 徐越 as Xie Chao Qun 謝超群

Supporting cast
Kelly Mi 米凱莉 as Chen Jia Huì 陳家慧 
Liu Cheng En as Chen Yi 沈一
Qiu De Yang 邱德洋 as Andy
You Xuan 游喧 as Xuan Xuan 萱萱
Xu Shuo 許爍 as Yaya 牙牙

Cameos
Bai Yun 白雲 as Shoe shop owner 鞋店老闆
Zhang Da De 張達得 as Wan Shao Jun 萬少君
He Xi 荷希 as Zhou Lì Lì周莉莉

Soundtrack
No official soundtrack album was released for Ia Ia, I Do. Songs from the soundtrack are taken from Richie Jen's 2011 album Dare Devil (不信邪), Mayday's 2011 album The Second Round (第二人生), Della Ding's 2012 album One In A Thousand (好難得), and Victor Wong's 2012 album Unopened Gift (未拆的礼物). The opening theme song is "I Only Like This 我就是喜歡這樣" by Richie Jen and Della Ding. The closing theme song is "Starry Night 星空" by Mayday.

"I Only Like This 我就是喜歡這樣" by Richie Jen 任賢齊 & Della Ding 丁噹
"Starry Night 星空" by Mayday 五月天
"One Person Is Impossible 一個人不可能" by Della Ding 丁噹
"I Am Still The Same 我還是一樣"  by Della Ding 丁噹
"Does He Still Know Me 他還認不認得我" by Della Ding 丁噹
"Radiance 光芒" by Richie Jen 任賢齊
"Perfect Miracle 完美的奇蹟" by Richie Jen 任賢齊
"Brave Souls 勇敢的靈魂" by Victor Wong 品冠

Filming locations
Major filming took place in Taipei, Taiwan and Dongshan County in Fujian province, China. Dongshan County served as the location for the fishing village Yuan Zhou Island. Controversy surrounded the drama after filming finished at Dongshan County. Lead actress Tammy Chen said the beautiful fishing village depicted in the drama was actually an impoverished village with a lack of resources. She stated in an interview that there was no hot water where they stayed, only one bathroom in the entire village, lack of stock and supplies at the local grocery store and lack of food when witnessing villagers during meals.

Broadcast
Ia Ia, I Do was first broadcast on Chinese channels Shenzhen Satellite TV and Anhui Television on March 12, 2012 airing the 40 minute without behind the scenes 24 episodes version. Taiwan's CTV's version began airing the 90 minute with behind the scenes 15 episode version on March 2, 2012. CTV's re-broadcast of the 90 minute with behind the scenes 15 episodes version aired weekly at 4:30 PM. Later CTV re-aired the drama on its HD channel airing a 60-minute without the behind the scenes 15 episode version on June 6, 2012. China's 24 episode version can still be seen on Tudou's streaming website.

Episode ratings
Ia Ia, I Do mostly ranked third throughout the series airing with a total average of 0.74. The viewers' survey was conducted by AGB Nielsen with a survey range of 4yo TV audience.

Competing dramas on rival channels airing at the same time slot were:
TTV - Love Forward, Miss Rose
CTS - Alice in Wonder City, Waking Love Up
FTV - Absolute Darling, Once Upon a Love

References

External links
CTV website
Facebook page
Tudou website

2012 Taiwanese television series debuts
2012 Taiwanese television series endings
China Television original programming
Taiwanese romance television series